Saskatoon station is a historic railway station building in Saskatoon, Saskatchewan, Canada. It was built in 1908. It was designated a National Historic Site of Canada in 1976, and has also been protected as a Heritage Railway Station of Canada since 1990.

Saskatoon earned the nickname Hub City from the contributions of the CPR, CNR and GTP. The station was situated on the Regina, Saskatchewan to Edmonton, Alberta rail line.

Geography and location 
Saskatoon's CP station is located at 305 Idylwyld Drive, in the Caswell Hill Neighborhood, Core Neighbourhoods Suburban Development Area.

History 

Opened in 1908, the station served as a passenger depot, telegraph station, mail and freight depot.  The CPR discontinued passenger service in 1960, maintaining it as an office site until 1993 when it was sold to Ken Achs who restored the building.

The CP station has not been used as a rail station for many years, and currently houses several businesses. Received the 1995 SAHS (Saskatchewan Architectural Heritage Society) Heritage Architecture Excellence Awards which was bestowed by Saskatchewan's Lieutenant-Governor.

The city of Saskatoon is served by Via Rail's The Canadian service; however, that line uses the New Saskatoon Railway Station located southwest of the downtown core.

Nearby 
Two other municipal heritage buildings are close to the Saskatoon Railway Station (Canadian Pacific), the Rumely Warehouse, built in 1913 and the Fairbanks Morse Warehouse.  Both are located in the Central Business District  which sprang up to support both the CNR railway station and railyards and the CPR.  The Midtown Plaza shopping mall was built on the site of the former downtown CNR railway station in the late 1960s; in the 1990s the mall underwent a major renovation that included changing the front facade to resemble the style of the old railway station.

Footnotes 

Canadian Pacific Railway stations in Saskatchewan
Transport in Saskatoon
Buildings and structures in Saskatoon
Railway stations closed in 1960
Designated Heritage Railway Stations in Saskatchewan
Railway stations in Canada opened in 1908
National Historic Sites in Saskatchewan
Disused railway stations in Canada
1908 establishments in Saskatchewan
Canadian Register of Historic Places in Saskatchewan